Nora Baumberger (née Dvořáková; born 23 October 1969), known by the stage name Dolly Buster, is a Czech-German former pornographic actress, filmmaker, and author.

Career
Buster has starred in over one hundred X-rated European movies. She is also the author of a successful series of crime-novels about a German porn-star-turned-amateur-sleuth.

She appeared in the German version of I'm a Celebrity... Get Me Out of Here!.
In 2004, she attempted to obtain a seat in the European parliament as a candidate of a minority Czech political party. The party got 0.71% of votes.

Personal life
Buster lives with her husband in Wesel, Germany, also indulging in painting and drawing, having taken life-drawing classes from Arnim Tölke at the Kunstakademie Düsseldorf.

Awards
She was voted Germany's "hottest porn star" in 2009. She has also won several Venus Awards, including a Lifetime Achievement Award in 2000 and a Special Jury Award in 2003.

References

External links

 
 
 

1969 births
Living people
Czech pornographic film actresses
Kunstakademie Düsseldorf alumni
German pornographic film actresses
German pornographic film producers
Czech pornographic film producers
Film directors from Prague
Actresses from Prague
Writers from Prague
Ich bin ein Star – Holt mich hier raus! participants